Gola Bazar may refer to:

 Gola Bazar, Bihar
 Gola Bazar, Uttar Pradesh